Roxanne Kimberly Barker (born 6 May 1991) is a South African soccer player who plays as a goalkeeper for Dutch club SC Heerenveen and the South Africa women's national team.

Early life

Pepperdine University
Barker trained at the university level in the United States playing for the Pepperdine University women's college soccer team.

Playing career

Club
After completing her studies, Barker was selected by Portland Thorns FC in the 2013 NWSL College Draft. Portland Thorns preferred Adelaide Gay as understudy to their experienced goalkeeper Karina LeBlanc.

Barker played for the W-League club Pali Blues during her university holidays.

She then returned to South Africa and played ten games for Maties FC, before taking up a professional contract in Iceland.

Earlier in her career, Barker had played as a centre-back for Durban Ladies FC as well as in the position of goalkeeper.

Barker signed up with the Icelandic Úrvalsdeild club Þór/KA for the 2014 and 2015 seasons. Roxy won Most Valuable Player for the Icelandic Úrvalsdeild club Þór/KA 2015 season. She signed with SC Heerenveen vrouwen in the Dutch league for the 2016–2017 season.

International
Barker made her South Africa debut in a 6–0 win over Tanzania in July 2010. She represented the senior national team (also known as "Banyana Banyana") at the 2012 London Olympics.

Barker had represented South Africa in 28 games when she was called into the squad for the 2016 Rio Olympics.

References

External links

 
 Profile at Connect World Football
 

1991 births
Living people
Sportspeople from Pietermaritzburg
Women's association football goalkeepers
South Africa women's international soccer players
South African women's soccer players
Footballers at the 2012 Summer Olympics
Footballers at the 2016 Summer Olympics
Olympic soccer players of South Africa
South African expatriate soccer players
Expatriate women's soccer players in the United States
USL W-League (1995–2015) players
Pepperdine Waves women's soccer players
White South African people
South African people of British descent
Expatriate women's footballers in the Netherlands
Eredivisie (women) players
SC Heerenveen (women) players
Portland Thorns FC draft picks
Roxanne Barker